Eleanor Myerson (c. 1922–2016) was an American Democratic politician from in Brookline, Massachusetts. She represented the 11th Suffolk district in the Massachusetts House of Representatives from 1983 to 1991.

She was born in Winthrop, Massachusetts. On November 20, 2016, at age 94, she died at Falmouth Hospital after a cerebral hemorrhage.

References

1920s births
2016 deaths
Members of the Massachusetts House of Representatives
Women state legislators in Massachusetts
20th-century American women politicians
20th-century American politicians
People from Brookline, Massachusetts
People from Winthrop, Massachusetts
21st-century American women